The House of Henneberg was a medieval German comital family (Grafen) which from the 11th century onwards held large territories in the Duchy of Franconia. Their county was raised to a princely county (Gefürstete Grafschaft) in 1310.

Upon the extinction of the line in the late 16th century, most of the territory was inherited by the Saxon House of Wettin and subsequently incorporated into the Thuringian estates of its Ernestine branch.

Origins
The distant origins of this family are speculative yet seem to originate in the Middle Rhine Valley, east of modern-day France. Charibert, a nobleman in Neustria is the earliest recorded ancestor of the family, dating before 636.  Five generations pass between Charibert and the next descendant of note, Robert III of Worms. Both the Capetian dynasty and the Elder House of Babenberg (Popponids) are direct male lineal descendants of Count Robert I and therefore referred to as Robertians.

The designation Babenberger, from the castle of Bamberg (Babenberch), was established in the 12th century by the chronicler Otto of Freising, himself a member of the Babenberg family. The later House of Babenberg, which ruled what became the Duchy of Austria, claimed to come of the Popponid dynasty. However, the descent of the first margrave Leopold I of Austria († 994) remains uncertain.

County of Henneberg

In the 11th century, the dynasty's estates around the ancestral seat Henneberg Castle near Meiningen belonged to the German stem duchy of Franconia. They were located southwest of the Rennsteig ridge in the Thuringian Forest, then forming the border with the possessions held by the Landgraves of Thuringia in the north. In 1096 one Count Godebold II of Henneberg served as a burgrave of the Würzburg bishops, his father Poppo had been killed in battle in 1078. In 1137 he established Vessra Abbey near Hildburghausen as the family's house monastery.

The counts lost their position as the bishops were raised to "Dukes of Franconia" in the 12th century. Nevertheless, in the course of the War of the Thuringian Succession upon the death of Landgrave Henry Raspe, Count Herman I of Henneberg (1224–1290) in 1247 received the Thuringian lordship of Schmalkalden from the Wettin margrave Henry III of Meissen. After the extinction of the Bavarian House of Andechs upon the death of Duke Otto II of Merania in 1248, the Counts of Henneberg also inherited their Franconian lordship of Coburg (then called the "new lordship", later Saxe-Coburg).

In 1274 the Henneberg estates were divided into the Schleusingen, Aschach-Römhild and Hartenberg branches. Count Berthold VII of Henneberg-Schleusingen (1272–1340) was elevated to princely status in 1310, his estates comprised the towns of Schmalkalden, Suhl and Coburg. In 1343 the Counts of Hennberg also purchased the Thuringian town of Ilmenau. The Coburg lands passed to the Saxon House of Wettin upon the marriage of Countess Catherine of Henneberg to Margrave Frederick III of Meissen in 1347.

After the Imperial Reform of 1500, the County of Henneberg formed the northernmost part of the Franconian Circle, bordering on the Upper Saxon Ernestine duchies and the lands of the Upper Rhenish prince-abbacy of Fulda in the northwest. A thorn in the side remained the enclave of Meiningen, a fief held by the Bishops of Würzburg, which was not acquired by the counts until 1542.

Disestablishment
Whereas the male line of the House of Babenberg became extinct in 1246, the Counts of Henneberg lived on until 1583. In 1554 William IV of Henneberg-Schleusingen had signed a treaty of inheritance with Duke John Frederick II of Saxony. However, when the last Count George Ernest of Henneberg died, both the Ernestine and the Albertine branch of the Wettin dynasty claimed his estates, that were finally divided in 1660 among the Ernestine duchies of Saxe-Weimar and Saxe-Gotha and the Albertine duke Maurice of Saxe-Zeitz. The Lordship of Schmalkalden fell to Landgrave William IV of Hesse-Kassel, according to an inheritance treaty of 1360.

After the Congress of Vienna (1815), the former Albertine parts around Schleusingen and Suhl fell to the Prussian province of Saxony. King Frederick William III of Prussia assumed the title of a Princely Count of Henneberg, which his successors in the House of Hohenzollern have borne ever since.

Counts of Henneberg

Partitions of Henneberg under Henneberg rule

Table of rulers 
(Note: Here the numbering of the counts is the same for all counties, as all (or at least the majority of them) were titled Counts of Henneberg, despite of the different parts of land and its particular numbering of the rulers. The princes are numbered by the year of their succession.)

Notable members of the Henneberg family

 Bertold von Henneberg-Römhild (1442 – December 21, 1504), Prince-elector and archbishop of Mainz, son of George, count of Henneberg-Römhild.
 Count Otto von Henneberg, known commonly as Otto von Botenlauben from 1206, probably born in 1177 in Henneberg, died in Reiterswiesen near Bad Kissingen before 1245, was a German minnesinger, crusader and founder of Frauenroth Abbey.
 Herman I, Count of Henneberg
 Catherine of Henneberg
 William II, Princely count of Henneberg-Schleusingen
 William III, Princely count of Henneberg-Schleusingen
 William IV, Princely count of Henneberg-Schleusingen

Castles

Coats of arms incorporating Henneberg

See also

 Bishopric of Würzburg
 Vessra Abbey
 Aura Abbey
 Römhild
 Sondheim vor der Rhön
 Münnerstadt
 Irmelshausen
 Bad Kissingen (district)
 Poppo
 William II, German Emperor/Scraps
 Schmalkalden-Meiningen
 Wartburgkreis
 Hildburghausen (district)
 List of states in the Holy Roman Empire (H)

References

 Schwennicke, Detlev.  Europäische Stammtafeln: Stammtafeln zur Geschichte der Europäischen Staaten, Neue Folge. [European Family Trees: Family Trees for the History of European States, New Series.]  BAND II, Tafel 10:Die Robertiner I und die Anfänge des Hauses Capet, 922-923 König der Westfranken, Marburg, Verlag von J.A. Stargardt (1984)
 Historische Landkarte: Grafschaft Henneberg 1755 mit den Ämtern Schleusingen, Suhl, Kühndorf mit Bennshausen, Reprint 2003, Verlag Rockstuhl, 
 Johannes Mötsch: Regesten des Archivs der Grafen von Henneberg-Römhild. Volumes 1 und 2. Böhlau, Köln etc. 2006,

External links

Henneberg Genealogy
 Direct male descent of Babenberger from Robertiner (Capet) family, in the German Wikipedia
 Early Babenberger genealogy, in the German Wikipedia

 
German noble families
Noble families of the Holy Roman Empire
Babenberg
Principalities of the Holy Roman Empire